The Cup (ཕོར་པ། or Phörpa) is a 1999 Tibetan-language film directed by Khyentse Norbu. The plot involves two young football-crazed Tibetan refugee novice monks in a remote Himalayan monastery in India who desperately try to obtain a television for the monastery to watch the 1998 World Cup final. The movie was submitted by Bhutan (its 1st submission) for Best Foreign Film at the 72nd Academy Awards but was not nominated.

Production 

The movie was shot in the Tibetan refugee village Bir in India (Himachal Pradesh) (almost entirely between Chokling Gompa and Elu Road).

Producer Jeremy Thomas had developed a relationship with Norbu when he was an advisor on Bertolucci's Little Buddha. Thomas later remembered his experience making the film:

Release 
The Cup was released to DVD on November 13, 2007 in North America by Festival Media (IBFF). The DVD was mastered from a new direct-to-digital transfer from the original film, and includes a bonus documentary entitled Inside The Cup, featuring the director discussing the film, cinema in general and Buddhist philosophy, along with outtakes from the film. There is also a director's commentary audio track.

See also
 List of submissions to the 72nd Academy Awards for Best Foreign Language Film
 List of Bhutanese submissions for the Academy Award for Best International Feature Film

References

External links 
 

1999 films
Association football films
1990s sports comedy films
Tibetan-language films
Films about Buddhism
Films about Tibet
Tibetan Buddhist art and culture
Bhutanese comedy films
1999 comedy films
Films shot in Himachal Pradesh
Films set in India
Films set in 1998